Meisenheim is a former Verbandsgemeinde ("collective municipality") in the district of Bad Kreuznach, Rhineland-Palatinate, Germany. The seat of the Verbandsgemeinde was in Meisenheim. On 1 January 2020 it was merged into the new Verbandsgemeinde Nahe-Glan.

The Verbandsgemeinde Meisenheim consisted of the following Ortsgemeinden ("local municipalities"):

 Abtweiler
 Becherbach
 Breitenheim
 Callbach
 Desloch
 Hundsbach
 Jeckenbach
 Lettweiler
 Löllbach
 Meisenheim
 Raumbach
 Rehborn
 Reiffelbach
 Schmittweiler
 Schweinschied

Former Verbandsgemeinden in Rhineland-Palatinate